Solariella multirestis is a species of sea snail, a marine gastropod mollusk in the family Solariellidae.

Distribution
This marine species occurs off St. Vincent, Lesser Antilles, at depths between 201 m and 251 m.

Description 
The maximum recorded shell length is 11.8 mm.

Habitat 
Minimum recorded depth is 201 m. Maximum recorded depth is 251 m.

References

 Quinn, J. F., Jr. 1979. Biological results of the University of Miami deep-sea expeditions. 130. The systematics and zoogeography of the gastropod family Trochidae collected in the straits of Florida and its approaches. Malacologia 19: 1–62
 Rosenberg, G., F. Moretzsohn, and E. F. García. 2009. Gastropoda (Mollusca) of the Gulf of Mexico, Pp. 579–699 in Felder, D.L. and D.K. Camp (eds.), Gulf of Mexico–Origins, Waters, and Biota. Biodiversity. Texas A&M Press, College Station, Texas

multirestis
Gastropods described in 1979